The 2019–20 Marquette Golden Eagles men's basketball team represented Marquette University in the 2019–20 NCAA Division I men's basketball season. The Golden Eagles, led by sixth-year head coach Steve Wojciechowski, played their home games at Fiserv Forum as members of the Big East Conference.

Previous season
The Golden Eagles finished the 2018–19 season 24–10, 12–6 in Big East play to finish in second place. As the No. 2 seed in the Big East tournament, they defeated St. John’s in the quarterfinals before losing to Seton Hall in the semifinals. They received an at-large bid to the NCAA tournament as the No. 5 seed in the West region and were upset by Murray State in the First Round.

The season marked the first season for Marquette at the new Fiserv Forum in downtown Milwaukee.

Offseason

Coaching changes
In July 2019, associate head coach Brett Nelson was hired as the new head coach at Holy Cross. As a result, Wojciechowski elevated Jake Presutti from director of basketball operations to assistant coach.

Departures

Incoming transfers

2019 recruiting class

Roster

Schedule and results

|-
!colspan=9 style=| Exhibition

|-
!colspan=9 style=| Non-conference regular season

|-
!colspan=9 style=|Big East regular season

|-
!colspan=9 style=| Big East tournament

Rankings

*AP does not release post-NCAA Tournament rankings^Coaches did not release a Week 2 poll.

References

Marquette Golden Eagles
Marquette Golden Eagles men's basketball seasons
Marquette
Marquette